The 1950 Bradley Braves baseball team represented Bradley University in the 1950 NCAA baseball season. The Braves played their home games at Tom Connor Field. The team was coached by Leo Schrall in his 2nd year at Bradley.

The Braves won the District V playoff to advance to the College World Series, where they were defeated by the Tufts Jumbos.

Roster

Schedule 

! style="" | Regular season
|- valign="top" 

|- align="center" bgcolor="#ccffcc"
| 1 || April 1 || Wisconsin || Tom Connor Field • Peoria, Illinois || 8–7 || 1–0 || –
|- align="center" bgcolor="#ffcccc"
| 2 || April 1 || Wisconsin || Tom Connor Field • Peoria, Illinois || 5–10 || 1–1 || –
|- align="center" bgcolor="#ffcccc"
| 3 || April 4 || at  || Perry Field • Gainesville, Florida || 8–2 || 1–2 || –
|- align="center" bgcolor="#ffcccc"
| 4 || April 5 || at Florida || Perry Field • Gainesville, Florida || 6–10 || 1–3 || –
|- align="center" bgcolor="#ccffcc"
| 5 || April 6 || vs  || Alfond Stadium • Winter Park, Florida || 3–2 || 2–3 || –
|- align="center" bgcolor="#bbbbbb"
| 6 || April 7 || at  || Alfond Stadium • Winter Park, Florida || 0–0 || 2–3–1 || –
|- align="center" bgcolor="#ccffcc"
| 7 || April 7 || at Rollins || Alfond Stadium • Winter Park, Florida || 11–8 || 3–3–1 || –
|- align="center" bgcolor="#ffcccc"
| 8 || April 8 || vs Clemson || Alfond Stadium • Winter Park, Florida || 1–9 || 3–4–1 || –
|- align="center" bgcolor="#ffcccc"
| 9 || April 10 || at  || Seminole Field • Tallahassee, Florida || 2–3 || 3–5–1 || –
|- align="center" bgcolor="#ccffcc"
| 10 || April 11 || at Florida State || Seminole Field • Tallahassee, Florida || 10–1 || 4–5–1 || –
|- align="center" bgcolor="#ffcccc"
| 11 || April 15 ||  || Tom Connor Field • Peoria, Illinois || 3–6 || 4–6–1 || –
|- align="center" bgcolor="#ffcccc"
| 12 || April 17 || at  || Unknown • Iowa City, Iowa || 0–1 || 4–7–1 || –
|- align="center" bgcolor="#ccffcc"
| 13 || April 18 || at Iowa || Unknown • Iowa City, Iowa || 6–2 || 5–7–1 || –
|- align="center" bgcolor="#ccffcc"
| 14 || April 21 ||  || Tom Connor Field • Peoria, Illinois || 11–2 || 6–7–1 || 1–0
|- align="center" bgcolor="#ccffcc"
| 15 || April 22 || Drake || Tom Connor Field • Peoria, Illinois || 10–4 || 7–7–1 || 2–0
|- align="center" bgcolor="#ccffcc"
| 16 || April 29 ||  || Tom Connor Field • Peoria, Illinois || 4–0 || 8–7–1 || 3–0
|-

|- align="center" bgcolor="#ccffcc"
| 17 || May 5 || at  || Unknown • Detroit, Michigan || 9–0 || 9–7–1 || 4–0
|- align="center" bgcolor="#ccffcc"
| 18 || May 6 || at Detroit || Unknown • Detroit, Michigan || 15–6 || 10–7–1 || 5–0
|- align="center" bgcolor="#ccffcc"
| 19 || May 8 ||  || Tom Connor Field • Peoria, Illinois || 10–2 || 11–7–1 || 5–0
|- align="center" bgcolor="#ffcccc"
| 20 || May 10 || at Chicago || Unknown • Chicago, Illinois || 5–10 || 11–8–1 || 5–0
|-

|-
! style="" | Postseason
|- valign="top"

|- align="center" bgcolor="#ccffcc"
| 21 || May 12 ||  || Tom Connor Field • Peoria, Illinois || 9–3 || 12–8–1 || 5–0
|- align="center" bgcolor="#ffcccc"
| 22 || May 13 || Oklahoma A&M || Tom Connor Field • Peoria, Illinois || 4–8 || 12–9–1 || 5–0
|- align="center" bgcolor="#ccffcc"
| 23 || May 13 || Oklahoma A&M || Tom Connor Field • Peoria, Illinois || 2–1 || 13–9–1 || 5–0
|-

|- align="center" bgcolor="#ccffcc"
| 24 || May 19 ||  || Tom Connor Field • Peoria, Illinois || 10–5 || 14–9–1 || 5–0
|- align="center" bgcolor="#ccffcc"
| 25 || May 20 || St. Thomas (Minnesota) || Tom Connor Field • Peoria, Illinois || 4–3 || 15–9–1 || 5–0
|- align="center" bgcolor="#ffcccc"
| 26 || May 22 || at Wisconsin || Guy Lowman Field • Madison, Wisconsin || 4–6 || 15–10–1 || 5–0
|-

|- align="center" bgcolor="#ccffcc"
| 27 || May 30 || at  || Husker Diamond • Lincoln, Nebraska || 10–6 || 16–10–1 || 5–0
|- align="center" bgcolor="#ccffcc"
| 28 || May 30 || at Nebraska || Husker Diamond • Lincoln, Nebraska || 8–4 || 17–10–1 || 5–0
|-

|- align="center" bgcolor="#ccffcc"
| 29 || June 2 || at  || Old College Field • East Lansing, Michigan || 3–6 || 17–11–1 || 5–0
|- align="center" bgcolor="#ccffcc"
| 30 || June 3 || at Michigan State || Old College Field • East Lansing, Michigan || 3–4 || 17–12–1 || 5–0
|- align="center" bgcolor="#ccffcc"
| 31 || June 10 || at  || Unknown • West Lafayette, Indiana || 5–10 || 17–13–1 || 5–0
|-

|- align="center" bgcolor="#ffcccc"
| 32 || June 16 || vs Alabama || Omaha Municipal Stadium • Omaha, Nebraska || 2–9 || 17–14–1 || 5–0
|- align="center" bgcolor="#ffcccc"
| 33 || June 18 || vs Tufts || Omaha Municipal Stadium • Omaha, Nebraska || 4–5 || 17–15–1 || 5–0
|-

References 

Bradley
Bradley Braves baseball seasons
Bradley Braves baseball
College World Series seasons
Missouri Valley Conference baseball champion seasons